Judaism as a Civilization: Toward a Reconstruction of American-Jewish Life is a 1934 work on Judaism and American Jewish life by Rabbi Mordecai M. Kaplan, the founder of Reconstructionist Judaism.

The book is Kaplan's most notable work and has influenced a number of American Jewish thinkers. Kaplan's work centers around the concept that Judaism ought not to be defined as the religion of the Jews, but the sum of Jewish religion, culture, language, literature and social organization.

Background
In 1934, Kaplan published Judaism as a Civilization, a seminal work that eventually provided the theological foundation for the new Reconstructionist movement. Kaplan was deeply influenced by the new field of sociology and its definition of "civilization" as characterized not only by beliefs and rituals, but also by art, culture, ethics, history, language, literature, social organization, symbols and local customs.

Kaplan argued that Judaism is in essence a religious civilization; the religious elements of Judaism are primarily human, naturalistic expressions of a specific culture. Kaplan felt that Jewish group survival in the United States depended on Jews reconstructing their lives on the cultural foundation of a historical peoplehood.

Contents
Judaism as a Civilization is divided as follows:
 Introduction
 Part One - The Factors in the Crises
 Part Two - The Current Versions of Judaism
 Part Three - The Proposed Version of Judaism
 Part Four - Israel: The Status and Organization of Jewry
 Part Five - God: The Development of the Jewish Religion
 Part Six - Torah: Judaism as a Way of Life for the American Jew
 Conclusion

References

1934 books
Books about Judaism
Reconstructionist Judaism
Reconstructionist Zionism